Buckhead is large uptown district of Atlanta, Georgia, United States.

Buckhead may also refer to:

Atlanta
Buckhead (MARTA station), rapid-rail station
Buckhead Atlanta, a mixed-use development in Buckhead
Buckhead Church, in-town campus of North Point Ministries
Buckhead Forest, neighborhood
Buckhead Grand, skyscraper
Buckhead Theatre, historic events venue
Buckhead Village, historic business area
North Buckhead, neighborhood in Atlanta, Georgia

Other uses
East Buckhead, Brookhaven, DeKalb County, Georgia
Buckhead, Bryan County, Georgia, a census-designated place
Buckhead, Morgan County, Georgia, a small town
Buckhead Ridge, Florida, a census-designated place in Glades County, Florida

See also
The head of an animal called a buck, for animals called "buck", see List of animal names
Battle of Buck Head Creek, an 1864 battle during William Tecumseh Sherman's March to the Sea in the American Civil War
Buckhead, Georgia (disambiguation)
New Bucks Head, sports stadium in Telford, England